is a retired female Japanese judo wrestler.

Teshima was born in Hōfu, Yamaguchi, and began judo from 4th grade in elementary school. She entered the Sumitomo Marine & Fire Insurance after graduating from high school in 1993. She excelled at Osotogari, and also coached former world champion Gella Vandecaveye.

In 1997, Teshima participated in the World Judo Championships in Paris but was defeated by Cho Min-Sun in the first round. In 1998, she also participated in the Asian Games in Bangkok and won a silver medal. After then, she was regarded as one of the candidates of representative at Olympic Games in 2000 but was unable due to an anterior cruciate ligament injury. She retired in 2001, after the All-Japan Businessman Championships.

As of 2010, Teshima coaches judo at the Mitsui Sumitomo Insurance Group judo club, which she formerly belonged to.

Achievements
1994 - Fukuoka International Women's Championships (-63 kg) 3rd
 - All-Japan Women's Weight Class Championships (-66 kg) 1st
 - All-Japan Businessgroup Championships (-66 kg) 1st
1996 - Fukuoka International Women's Championships (-63 kg) 3rd
 - All-Japan Women's Weight Class Championships (-66 kg) 1st
 - All-Japan Businessgroup Championships (-66 kg) 1st
1997 - World Championships (-66 kg) loss
 - Fukuoka International Women's Championships (-63 kg) 1st
 - All-Japan Selected Championships (-66 kg) 1st
1998 - Tournoi Super World Cup Paris (-63 kg) 1st
1999 - Fukuoka International Women's Championships (-63 kg) 1st
 - Fukuoka International Women's Championships (-63 kg) 1st
 - All-Japan Selected Championships (-63 kg) 3rd
 - All-Japan Businessgroup Championships (-63 kg) 3rd
2000 - Fukuoka International Women's Championships (-63 kg) 2nd
 - Tournoi Super World Cup Paris (-63 kg) 2nd
 - All-Japan Selected Championships (-63 kg) 2nd
 - All-Japan Women's Weight Class Championships (-63 kg) 1st

References

Japanese female judoka
People from Yamaguchi Prefecture
1974 births
Living people
Asian Games medalists in judo
Judoka at the 1998 Asian Games
Asian Games silver medalists for Japan
Medalists at the 1998 Asian Games
20th-century Japanese women